Kyle Polak (born February 6, 1984 in Huntington Beach, California) is a former American soccer player, who is currently working as Goalkeeper coach by Cape Fear SC.

Career
Polak started his active career in the Wolfpack Soccer Club in Fountain Valley, California. He played besides from 1999 to 2003 for the Barons, the Athletic team of the Fountain Valley High School. After his graduating signed for his studies by the California State University, Fullerton.

College
Polak played two years of college soccer at the California State University, Fullerton before transferring to California State University, Dominguez Hills as a junior. Polak holds the record for career wins (44) and career shut outs (24) at Dominguez Hills, and was named Male Athlete of the Year.  Daktronics Men's Soccer far West 1st Team. NSCAA first team All-Region and First Team All-California Collegiate Athletic Association 2006.

Second-team all California Collegiate Athletic Association (2004–05)
+  First team all California Collegiate Athletic Association (2006).
+  Daktronics Men's Soccer Far West 1st-Team (2006)
+  NSCAA first team All-Region (2006)

Professional
After spending a year with Major League Soccer team Chivas USA's reserves in 2007, Polak signed with the Wilmington Hammerheads in the USL Second Division prior to the 2008 season. He didn't make any first team appearances for the Hammerheads in his rookie season, spending the entire year as backup to first choice keeper John O'Hara; he finally made his pro debut on July 2, 2009 in a 3-2 loss to Charlotte Eagles when Hammerheads #1 Daryl Sattler picked up an injury. He signed than September 3, 2009 for League rival Charleston Battery, who played because of injuries, never a game with the club.

On March 24, 2011, Polak signed for a second stint with Wilmington, now playing in the USL Pro league. He signed then a two month loan contract with USL Pro League rival Charleston Battery, Polak played never a game for Battery and returned in summer 2011 to Wilmington. He played than the following two years in only ten games, before joined to Cape Fear SC.

Coaching career 
Polak began his working as Assistant athletic director by the Wilmington Family YMCA in North Carolina and worked for them until August 2011. In August his signing by Wilmington Hammerheads, was named as the club Assistant coach and worked in this position until December 2012. In December 2012 was named as Goalkeeper coach by the Cape Fear Soccer Club.

Honors

Wilmington Hammerheads
 USL Second Division Regular Season Champions (1): 2009

References

1984 births
Living people
American soccer players
Chivas USA players
American soccer coaches
Cal State Dominguez Hills Toros men's soccer players
USL Second Division players
Wilmington Hammerheads FC players
Association football goalkeepers
Charleston Battery players
USL Championship players
Cal State Fullerton Titans men's soccer players
American people of Polish descent
California State University, Fullerton alumni
Soccer players from California